Magda Kašpárková (born 26 October 1997) is a Czech handballer for Buxtehuder SV and the Czech national team.

She participated at the 2021 World Women's Handball Championship in Spain, placing 19th.

Achievements
Czech First Division:
Winner: 2019, 2021

References

External links

1997 births
Living people
Sportspeople from Olomouc
Czech female handball players